Ilkka Koski (10 June 1928 – 28 February 1993) was a Finnish heavyweight boxer who competed in the 1952 and 1956 Olympics. He won a bronze medal in 1952 and lost his first bout in 1956. Domestically he held the Finnish amateur heavyweight title in 1951–1956 and 1958. In 1958 he turned professional and had a record of seven victories (three by knockout), one loss and one draw, before retiring in 1962 due to an injury. In 2008 he was inducted into the Finnish Boxing Hall of Fame.

References 

1928 births
1993 deaths
Sportspeople from Jyväskylä
Boxers at the 1952 Summer Olympics
Boxers at the 1956 Summer Olympics
Heavyweight boxers
Olympic boxers of Finland
Olympic bronze medalists for Finland
Olympic medalists in boxing
Finnish male boxers
Medalists at the 1952 Summer Olympics
20th-century Finnish people